Nate Barnes is an American country music singer and songwriter.

Early life 
Barnes was born in South Haven, Michigan. Growing up, he worked at a blueberry farm and a nuclear power plant.

Musical career 
In 2020, Barnes took a vacation in Nashville, Tennessee where a friend introduced him to songwriter Jason Sellers and record label executive Benny Brown, who was formerly the president of BBR Music Group. After Barnes played songs for the two of them, Brown signed him to Quartz Hill Records, a record label that he had just founded. Barnes then wrote his first single, "You Ain't Pretty", with Sellers and Jimmy Yeary. The song was then released on TikTok, where it went on to gain over 12 million views after its 2021 release. Following this, he began working on his debut album with producers Mickey Jack Cones and Derek George. In addition to its release to radio, the song was made into a music video, which has aired on CMT.

By October 2021, "You Ain't Pretty" had reached number 47 on the Billboard Country Airplay charts.

Discography

Singles

References

American country singer-songwriters
Country musicians from Michigan
Living people
People from Van Buren County, Michigan
Year of birth missing (living people)
American male singer-songwriters
Singer-songwriters from Michigan